The Rear-Admiral, Alexandria was an administrative shore based appointment of the British Royal Navy. The post was established during the Second World War, subordinate to the Commander-in-Chief, Mediterranean Fleet then later the Commander-in-Chief, Levant.

The Navy List for 1940, 1941, and 1943 locates the admiral at Alexandra.

The post existed from 1939 to 1945. From November 1939 until February 1943 it was part of the Mediterranean Fleet until the Fleet was divided. After February 1943 the Rear-Admiral Alexandria came under the command of the new Commander-in-Chief, Levant, until January 1944 when the Mediterranean Fleet was reunified once more.

Incumbent admirals

The Rear-Admiral, Alexandria reported to the C-in-C, Mediterranean Fleet from November 1939 to February 1943, and then was resubordinated to the C-in-C, Levant until December 1943. Post holders included:

Headquarters staff
Base HQ was HMS Nile, borne in HMS Maidstone II.

Chief Staff Officer and Flag Captain, Alexandria

Captain-Superintendent, Alexandria
Post holders included:

Levant Area
The Senior Naval Officer, later Commander, Levant Area, was originally styled as Naval Officer-in-Charge, Haifa. His title was later changed to SNO Levant Area and his headquarters transferred to Beirut.

Cyprus Area

Naval Officer-in-Charge, Cyprian Ports
Post holders included:

Notes

References 
 Bertke, Donald A.; Kindell, Don; Smith, Gordon (2012). World War II Sea War, Volume 3 Donald A Bertke, Gordon Smith. .
 Helgason, Guðmundur (1995–2018). "Allied Warship Commanders of WWII – uboat.net". uboat.net.
 Houterman, Jerome N..; Koppes, Jeroen (2004–2006). "Royal Navy, Mediterranean Fleet 1939–1945". www.unithistories.com. Houterman and Koppes, Netherlands.
 
 Watson, Dr Graham. (2015) "Royal Navy Organisation in World War 2, 1939–1945". naval-history.net. Gordon Smith.

A